A minecart or mine cart (also known as a mine trolley or mine hutch) is a type of rolling stock found on a mine railway, used for moving ore and materials procured in the process of traditional mining. Minecarts are seldom used in modern operations, having largely been superseded in underground operations (especially coal mines) by more efficient belt conveyor systems that allow machines such as longwall shearers and continuous miners to operate at their full capacity, and above ground by large dumpers.

Terminology

Throughout the world, there are different titles for mine carts. In Wales, minecarts are known as drams. In the U.S. and elsewhere, the term skip – or skip wagon (older spelling: waggon) – is used. (See: Skip (container)#Etymology)

 
In particular, a V skip wagon is a side-tipping skid with a V-shaped body. (Images)

Design and operation
Minecarts range in size and usage, and are usually made of steel for hauling ore. Shaped like large, rectangular buckets, minecarts ride on metal tracks and were originally pushed or pulled by men and animals (supplemented later by rope-haulage systems). They were generally introduced in early modern time, replacing containers carried by men. Originally, they didn't run on a real "rail", where the wheels would have a rim to fit into the tracks, but with plain wheels on a wooden plank way, hold in track by a pin fitting into a guide groove, or by the underside of the cart itself which was lower than the wheels and fitted between the planks ("Hungarian system").

As mines increased in size and output, the aforementioned methods became impractical because of the distances and quantities of material involved, so larger carts would be used, hauled by narrow gauge diesel and electric locomotives (in coal mining operations, where gas that is flammable would present a problem, the locomotives would be flameproof or battery powered). These were also used to pull trains transporting miners to the workfaces.

Minecarts were very important in the history of technology because they evolved into railroad cars. See History of rail transport.

In popular culture 
Minecarts have been depicted as a type of thrill ride; for instance Indiana Jones uses one in an escape scene in Indiana Jones and the Temple of Doom.

Mine train roller coasters were inspired by minecarts.

Minecart levels, a term used for levels in which the player character takes a high-speed ride in a minecart, common level in video games, especially side-scrolling video games such as Donkey Kong Country. A minecart is also featured in Hoodwinked. Minecarts and tracks can be crafted by the player in Minecraft and used for transportation. They are also found in abandoned mineshafts that generate naturally as a part of the game's procedural generation.

In Great Britain, restored mine carts (known as "tubs") containing floral displays can commonly be seen on village greens and outside pubs in former coal mining areas such as Northumberland and County Durham.

Like in Great Britain, old mine carts are common decorations in Germany, sometimes accompanied by old mining tools. Especially in the Ruhr Area those carts can be found in many front yards.

See also
 Chaldron
 Corf
 
 Mineral wagon

References

 
 Rakes, Paul H. (2012). "Coal Mine Mechanization." The West Virginia Encyclopedia. West Virginia Humanities Council, Charleston, WV.

External links
 

Carts
Mining equipment
Traditional mining
Freight rolling stock